Erica australis, the Spanish heath or Spanish tree heath, is a species of flowering plant in the family Ericaceae, native to the western Iberian Peninsula (Portugal and Western Spain) and Northwest Africa (in Morocco). As a calcifuge, it requires sharply drained acidic soil in full sun.

The Latin specific epithet australis means “southern” - in this case, southern Europe (and northwestern Morocco).

This plant is cultivated as an ornamental, and has  produced numerous forms and cultivars. gaining the Royal Horticultural Society’s Award of Garden Merit for E. australis ‘Mr Robert’.

References

External links

australis
Taxa named by Carl Linnaeus